Ukum is a Local Government Area of Benue State, Nigeria.

The postal code of the area is 980.

References

Local Government Areas in Benue State